Zahid Qurban Alavi, commonly spelled as Zahid Qurban Alvi, was the interim caretaker Chief Minister of Sindh, Pakistan in 2013.
He was nominated by the preceding Chief Minister Qaim Ali Shah and Opposition leader in the Sindh Assembly Syed Sardar Ahmed.

References

Chief Ministers of Sindh
Living people
Muhajir people
Pakistani judges
Politicians from Karachi
Year of birth missing (living people)
Place of birth missing (living people)